Sara Kaljuvee (born February 7, 1993) is a Canadian rugby sevens and fifteens player. In 2016, she was named to Canada's first ever women's rugby sevens Olympic Team (TR). She is a two time gold medalist at the 2015 Pan American Games and the 2019 Pan American Games in Lima, Peru as a member of the Canada women's national rugby sevens team.

Kaljuvee was a part of the first ever women's Commonwealth Games tournament in 2018. She was also a member of the 2018 Sevens World Cup Team.

In 2022, Kaljuvee was selected and competed as the starting center in Canada's fifteens squad for the Rugby World Cup in New Zealand. Kaljuvee scored a try against Fiji in a warm-up match before the World Cup.

References

External links
 Sara Kaljuvee at Rugby Canada
 
 

1993 births
Living people
Canada international rugby sevens players
Female rugby sevens players
Pan American Games gold medalists for Canada
Pan American Games medalists in rugby sevens
Rugby sevens players at the 2015 Pan American Games
Rugby sevens players at the 2019 Pan American Games
Sportspeople from Toronto
Medalists at the 2015 Pan American Games
Medalists at the 2019 Pan American Games
Rugby sevens players at the 2018 Commonwealth Games
Commonwealth Games competitors for Canada
Canadian female rugby union players
Canada women's international rugby union players